The Xiaomi Mi 8 Explorer Edition is a flagship Android smartphone developed by Xiaomi Inc. It was launched at an event held in Shenzhen, China.

Specifications

Hardware 
The Xiaomi Mi 8 EE is powered by the Qualcomm Snapdragon 845 processor, with 8 GB LPDDR4X RAM and Adreno 630 GPU. It has a  FullHD plus AMOLED display and 128 GB of storage. The handset features a fingerprint scanner integrated into the display and a 3,000 mAh battery with a USB-C reversible connector which supports Quick Charge 4.0+. It does not feature a 3.5mm headphone jack. The Mi 8 EE includes a dual camera setup with a 12 MP sensor with wide angle lens and a 12 MP sensor with telephoto lens. The front camera has a 20 MP sensor with aperture f/2.0. The Mi 8 EE camera has an overall score of 99 and a photo score of 105 on DxOMark. It also introduces a 3D facial recognition, IR facial unlock and a dual band GPS which allows reception of L1 and L5 signals simultaneously. 

The Xiaomi Mi 8 EE features a transparent back which appears to show the working internal components of the phone. A controversy occurred over allegations that the visible internals are not the actual components of the phone but merely a sticker.

Xiaomi Mi 8 Pro 
Pro has more color options than standard or EE. It also has under–screen fingerprint sensor, but 3D facial recognition was cancelled.

References 

Android (operating system) devices
Xiaomi smartphones
Mobile phones introduced in 2018

Mobile phones with multiple rear cameras
Discontinued smartphones